Chichiș is a commune in Covasna County, Transylvania, Romania, composed of two villages:
Băcel / Kökösbácstelek
Chichiș / Kökös

It formed part of the Székely Land region of the historical Transylvania province.

Demographics
The commune has a Székely Hungarian majority. According to the 2011 census, it has a population of 1,519, of which 821 (54.05%) are Hungarian. Chichiș has an absolute Hungarian majority, while Băcel has an absolute Romanian majority.

References

Communes in Covasna County
Localities in Transylvania
Székely communities